Sunburst is a town in Toole County, Montana, United States. The population was 333 in the 2020 census.

It is roughly 30 miles north of Shelby and is near the Canada–US border.

History
Sunburst has its origins as a farming community and later saw significant population growth after oil development occurred in the 1920s. A refinery was built in 1922 with the discovery of oil in the Kevin Sunburst Oil Field. Since oil development in the area ceased in the 1970s, Sunburst has once again become a primarily agricultural town. The local high school gives homage to its past, as its students are known as the Sunburst Refiners. Its name comes from what is considered a dramatic sunrise that occurs when the sun comes over the Sweetgrass Hills and illuminates the local fields.

Sunburst incorporated in 1924.

Geography
Sunburst is located at  (48.883255, -111.908754). Interstate 15 passes through the community, with access from Exit 389. The Long Lake Waterfowl Production Area is nearby.

Climate
According to the Köppen Climate Classification system, Sunburst has a semi-arid climate, abbreviated "BSk" on climate maps.

Demographics

As of 2000 the median income for a household in the town was $58,250, and the median income for a family was $56,038. Males had a median income of $34,500 versus $11,333 for females. The per capita income for the town was $20,244. About 1.7% of families and 4.1% of the population were below the poverty line, including 4.4% of those under age 18 and 3.7% of those age 65 or over.

2010 census
As of the census of 2010, there were 375 people, 150 households, and 107 families residing in the town. The racial makeup of the town was 94.9% White, 0.5% Native American, 0.5% from other races, and 4.0% from two or more races. Hispanic or Latino of any race were 2.7% of the population.

There were 150 households, of which 34.0% had children under the age of 18 living with them, 60.7% were married couples living together, 6.7% had a female householder with no husband present, 4.0% had a male householder with no wife present, and 28.7% were non-families. 27.3% of all households were made up of individuals, and 12% had someone living alone who was 65 years of age or older. The average household size was 2.50 and the average family size was 2.98.

The median age in the town was 39.4 years. 25.1% of residents were under the age of 18; 7.2% were between the ages of 18 and 24; 22.1% were from 25 to 44; 31.9% were from 45 to 64; and 13.6% were 65 years of age or older. The gender makeup of the town was 49.6% male and 50.4% female.

Education
Sunburst Schools educates students from kindergarten through 12th grade. North Toole County High School's team name is the Refiners.

North Toole County Library is a public library in Sunburst.

References

Towns in Toole County, Montana